Quercus × hispanica, commonly known as Spanish oak, is tree in the family Fagaceae. It is a hybrid between the European trees Turkey oak (Quercus cerris) and cork oak (Quercus suber).

Distribution
Hybridisation occurs naturally in southwestern Europe where both parent species occur. The Lucombe oak cultivar is frequently found in British collections. To be a true Lucombe oak, cultivars must be clones of the original hybrid arising in William Lucombe's Exeter nursery.

Cultivation
A number of named cultivars are grown in gardens, parks, arboreta and botanical gardens.

Cultivars
 Quercus × hispanica 'Lucombeana' ("Lucombe oak"), originally raised by William Lucombe at his Exeter, UK nursery in 1762.
 Quercus × hispanica 'Waasland' ("Waasland select oak"), leaves display an unusual slender, lobed shape.
 Quercus × hispanica 'Waginengen' ("Waginengen oak")
 Quercus × hispanica 'Fulhamensis' ("Fulham oak")

References

hispanica
Trees of Europe
Trees of Mediterranean climate
Plants described in 1785
Hybrid plants